Shlomo ha-Levi Alkabetz, also spelt Alqabitz, Alqabes; ( 1500 – 1576) was a rabbi, kabbalist and poet perhaps best known for his composition of the song Lecha Dodi.

Biography 
Alkabetz studied Torah under Rabbi Yosef Taitatzak. In 1529, he married the daughter of Yitzhak Cohen, a wealthy householder living in Salonica. Alkabetz gave his father-in-law a copy of his newly completed work Manot ha-Levi. He settled in Adrianople where he wrote Beit Hashem, Avotot Ahava, Ayelet Ahavim and Brit HaLevi. This latter work he dedicated to his admirers in Adrianople. His students included Rabbi Shmuel Ozida, author of Midrash Shmuel on Avot, and Rabbi Avraham Galante, author of Yareach Yakar on Zohar. His circle included Moshe Alsheich and Yosef Karo, as well as his famous brother-in-law Moshe Cordovero.

Move to Safed 
Following the practice described in the Zohar of reciting biblical passages known as the Tikūn on the night of Shavuot, Rabbi Shlomo and Rabbi Joseph Karo stayed awake all that night reading. During the recitation of the required texts, Rabbi Karo had a mystical experience: The Shekhinah appeared as a maggid, praising the circle and telling them to move to the Land of Israel. When they stayed up again the second night of Shavuot, the Shekhinah was adamant about their moving to the land of Israel. The account was recorded by Alkabetz. He settled in Safed in 1535.

Thought 
His works written in Adrianople center on the holiness of the people Israel, the Land of Israel, and the specialness of the mitzvot.  Alkabetz accepts the tradition that Esther was married to Mordechai before being taken to the king's palace and becoming queen, and even continued her relationship with Mordechai after taking up her royal post. The view of midrash articulated by Alkabetz and other members of the school of Joseph Taitatsak represents an extension of the view of the authority of the oral law and halachic midrash to aggadic midrash and thus leads to the sanctification and near canonization of aggadic expansions of biblical narrative

Works 
Among his printed works:
Ayalet Ahavim (completed 1532, published 1552) on Song of Songs.
Brit HaLevi (1563), a kabbalistic commentary on the Passover Haggada.
Lecha Dodi (1579), a mystical hymn to inaugurate the Shabbat.
Manot HaLevi (completed 1529, published 1585) on the Book of Esther.
Or  Tzadikim, a book of sermons.
Shoresh Yishai (completed 1552, published 1561) on the Book of Ruth.

Among those existing in manuscript are:
Apiryon Shlomo,  Beit Hashem, Beit Tefilla, interpretations of the prayers.
Divrei Shlomo, on the section of Scripture known as Writings.
Lechem Shlomo, on the guidelines for the sanctification of meals, according to Kabbalah.
Mittato shel Shlomo, on the mystical significance of sexual union.
Naim Zemirot, on Psalms.
Pitzei Ohev, on the Book of Job.
Shomer Emunim, on the fundamental principles of faith.
Sukkat Shalom, Avotot Ahavah, on the Torah.

Burial place
He is buried in Old Cemetery of Tzfat / Safed.

Other notable rabbis also buried in Old Cemetery of Tzfat / Safed:
 Ari HaKadosh
 Alshich HaKadosh
 Moses ben Jacob Cordovero
 Joseph Karo

References

Bibliography 
 Joseph Yahalom, "Hebrew mystical poetry and its Turkish background," in Andreas Tietze and Joseph Yahalom, Ottoman Melodies Hebrew Hymns: a 16th century cross-cultural adventure (Budapest: Akadémiai Kiadó, 1995), pp. 9–43.
 Bracha Sack, The Secret Teaching of R. Shlomo Halevi Alkabetz (Ph. D., Brandeis University, 1977)

External links 
 
 
 Video Lecture on Rabbi Shlomo Alkabets by Dr. Henry Abramson

16th-century rabbis from the Ottoman Empire
Rabbis in Ottoman Galilee
Rabbis from Thessaloniki
Kabbalists
Jewish poets
Levites
Burials at the Old Jewish Cemetery, Safed
Rabbis in Safed
1500s births
1576 deaths